Frankie and Johnny is the twelfth soundtrack album by American singer and musician Elvis Presley, released on RCA Victor Records in mono and stereo, LPM/LSP 3553, on March 1, 1966. An excursion into Dixieland and ragtime music, it is the soundtrack to the 1966 film of the same name starring Presley. Recording sessions took place at Radio Recorders in Hollywood, California, on May 12, 13, and 14, 1965. It peaked at number 20 on the Top LP's chart.  It was certified Gold and Platinum on January 6, 2004 by the Recording Industry Association of America.

Content
To coincide with the 19th century setting of the film, some traditional song material was utilized for the soundtrack. "When the Saints Go Marching In" is an old gospel hymn that has become a jazz standard associated with the traditional hot jazz of New Orleans. It is paired in a medley with "Down by the Riverside", another traditional gospel song dating back to the relevant time period. Both are in the public domain, and the team of Giant, Baum, and Kaye captured the publishing for Freddy Bienstock and Presley's manager, Colonel Tom Parker. The title song, "Frankie and Johnny," is a variant on the American popular song first published in 1904 and credited to Hughie Cannon. With changed lyrics, another publishing royalty was secured for Gladys Music.

Stephen Thomas Erlewine wrote that, due to the film's period setting, the album is dominated by retro Dixieland music, while biographer Mike Eder wrote that the period setting allows the album to "[get] away with a bit more than usual", with a deliberately "outdated" sound. Peter Jones and Jopling Norman described the record as "very rag-time", with vibrant, brassy backings that add variety to Presley's catalogue. The authors of Elvis (2001) wrote that the album de-emphasised Presley's "rocking beat" in favour of "old-timey Dixie and ragtime beat". Adam Litovitz noted the mix of traditional songs "with an ersatz Dixieland flavor" alongside "blues, gospel, and gypsy music at their cheesiest." Regarding the title track, Eder noted that "touches of jazz" are rare on a Presley album. He also noted the "mock-gypsy melody" on "Chesay" and added that "Everybody Come Around", "Shout It Out" and "Come Along" have vaudeville arrangements with "old-time Dixie horns", ukulele and banjo.

Twelve songs were recorded at the sessions for Frankie and Johnny, and all were used and issued on the soundtrack. The title song was issued as a single, with "Please Don't Stop Loving Me" on the B-side. Released either just before or simultaneously with the album, depending if the disputed release dates are correct, "Frankie and Johnny" peaked at number 25 on the Billboard Hot 100, with the b-side also charting at number 45.

Critical reception

In a contemporary review of Frankie and Johnny for Record Mirror, Peter Jones and Jopling Norman wrote that Presley fans would enjoy the album's songs, while "trad fans" would enjoy the backings, noting that some listeners "might even think that Elvis has gone more versatile but it's only the backings." Overall he deemed the record to be "very pleasing and enjoyable".

In his retrospective review for AllMusic, Stephen Thomas Erlewine wrote that the album's Dixieland style kept Presley "far, far away from the swinging Mod explosion in pop music in 1966", further commenting that although the double-time breakdowns on "Shut It Out" features hints of "high-booted go-go-music", its impact is lessened by the late appearance of the song on the record, after "the clamor of the brass bands, tambourines, and bass drums". He added that "What Every Woman Lives For" and "Beginner's Luck" were minor highlights but that overall, "Frankie and Johnny is one relentless, noisy, ugly record, its decibel level cranked to the breaking point and Presley appearing singularly mirthless throughout."

In his 2016 ranking of Presley's 57 albums, Adam Litovitz of Variety placed Frankie and Johnny last. He noted that Presley had become tired with recording soundtracks and "threw a tantrum in the studio" and began recording his vocals away from the musicians, with the album being "the painful result". He criticised "What Every Woman Lives For" for being "ultra-sexist".

Mike Eder deemed the album a "miniscule improvement on the albums it followed and preceded", but still criticised the record and noted that it contains similarly "atrocious vocal mixes" to Presley's 1965 works. However, he noted some highlights, such as "Chesay" and the "second-rate vaudeville" songs, as well as some ballads "pretty enough to rise above the prevailing mood of languor". The authors of Elvis (2001) believed that Presley handled the ragtime and Dixieland material "very well", and highlighted the title song.

Reissues

Pickwick

During the 1970s, Pickwick Records obtained the rights to reissue Presley compilation albums previously issued under the budget RCA Camden label between 1969 and 1973. Several tracks from Frankie and Johnny had been included on Camden releases; in 1976, Pickwick expanded its mandate and reissued the film's soundtrack album with a new cover showing a 1970s-era image of Presley and the title slightly amended to Frankie & Johnny. The running order of the tracks was altered and three songs from the original album were omitted — "Chesay", "Look Out Broadway", and "Everybody Come Aboard". The front cover does not indicate that this is a reissued soundtrack album, and it was Elvis' only soundtrack to be reissued in this way. It did not chart on the Billboard 200. This oddity remained in print for several years and when, following Presley's death in August 1977, RCA began reissuing all of his albums, the agreement between RCA and Pickwick prohibited RCA from reissuing the original, complete soundtrack album in the US for several years due to the existence of this version. The original Frankie and Johnny soundtrack album was reissued in Canada and elsewhere however. Not until 2010 would the complete original Frankie and Johnny soundtrack be widely available in the United States again.

Follow That Dream
In 2003 Frankie and Johnny was reissued on the Follow That Dream label in a special edition that contained the original album tracks along with numerous alternate takes.

Track listing

Original release

Note
"Frankie and Johnny" was released as a single (RCA 8780) in March 1966 and appeared on Billboard's Hot 100 list for eight weeks.  Its highest position was number 25.  The single's B-side, "Please Don't Stop Loving Me", also charted for eight weeks and reached number 45.

Pickwick reissue

Note
"Chesay", "Look Out, Broadway", and "Everybody Come Aboard" were not included in the reissue.

Follow That Dream reissue

Personnel
 Elvis Presley – vocals
 The Jordanaires – backing vocals
 Eileen Wilson – vocals
 George Worth – trumpet
 Richard Noel – trombone
 John Johnson – tuba
 Gus Bivona – saxophone
 Scotty Moore – electric guitar
 Tiny Timbrell – acoustic guitar
 Charlie McCoy – harmonica
 Larry Muhoberac – piano
 Bob Moore – double bass
 D. J. Fontana – drums
Buddy Harman – drums

Charts

Album

Certifications and sales

References

External links

1966 soundtrack albums
Elvis Presley soundtracks
RCA Records soundtracks
RCA Victor soundtracks
Pickwick Records soundtracks
Albums produced by Fred Karger
Musical film soundtracks
Dixieland albums
Ragtime albums
Old-time music albums